Jerom is a Flemish comic book character and one of the main cast members in the Belgian comic strip, Suske en Wiske by Willy Vandersteen. He is the series' strongman and well known for his physically impossible powers that often make him the deus ex machina who solves every problem. Jerom's popularity with readers is so huge that he inspired at least two spin-off series: Jerom de Gouden Stuntman (1962–1991) and J. ROM - Force of Gold (2014).

In the earliest Dutch translations Jerom's name was changed into "Jeroen". This was changed back to Jerom when the entire series was translated into Algemeen Beschaafd Nederlands. In the English translations he has been named Wilbur, Jerome, or Jethro.

Debut

Jerom was introduced in the album De Dolle Musketiers ("The Zany Musketeers"; 1953). In this story Suske, Wiske, Lambik and Aunt Sidonia time travel to the 17th century where they work as musketeers for the French king. They have to fight against a French duke, Le Handru, who used a super strong thawed caveman, Jerom, as his secret weapon. At first the cast is powerless against him, but later Wiske is able to make Jerom their ally instead. Together they defeat Le Handru and at the end of the story Jerom travels back to 1953 with them.

Jerom's original appearance was inspired by the caveman Alley Oop by V.T. Hamlin. His name was inspired by Belgian playwright Jeroom Verten (1909–1958).

Character

When Jerom was first introduced in the series he was merely a dumb brute from the Stone Age. By order of duke Le Handru he beats up everyone without mercy. The only thing that can tame him is anise, which the duke frequently feeds him with. Wiske discovers that Jerom also has a softer side when he plays with her doll, Schanulleke, and is scared that she will die because she refuses to eat. Wiske makes her doll "eat" by drinking the milk Jerom prepared herself when he is not looking. This convinces Jerom that Wiske is nice and he is motivated to join their side instead, even travelling back to the 20th century with them, thus becoming the final main cast member of the series. He moved in at Lambik's place, despite the fact they often bicker about.

In the first albums Jerom behaves and dresses like an uncivilized caveman. In De Knokkersburcht ("The Knokkers Fortress") (1953) he even literally behaves like a dog. After a few albums he gradually acts more polite towards others and starts to dress in modern 20th century suits. First by wearing a tie above his animal skin in De Tam Tam Kloppers ("The Tam Tam Beaters"; 1953), then gradually wearing sweaters, shirts, jeans and shoes. Jerom even obeys his own ethics. He only fights for just causes and helps everybody, even opponents, when they are in danger. He can't be bribed and never betrays his friends, contrary to someone like Lambik. Jerom also never fights animals and tries to control his powers. Only when he is put under a magic spell, hypnotized or drugged with chloroform Jerom joins the antagonists.

Jerom is usually calm and level headed. When other people around him act aggressive or showcase other heavy emotions Jerom always remains restrained and master of the situation. He always talks in a telegram style and shortens Lambik's name as "Bik". Because of his brutish appearance and simplistic way of speaking other people, even his friends, often underestimate his intelligence. They treat him like a child or a simple minded person. Sidonia often uses Jerom to do difficult or tedious tasks for her, like cleaning the dishes. This behaviour is not entirely unjustified, seeing that Jerom is often not familiar with certain modern phenomena and needs to be explained about them. Despite being far more civilized than he was when he first appeared in the series Jerom still doesn't always feel at ease in modern society. In 
De Malle Mergpijp ("The Silly Marrowbone"; 1973) he even goes through an identity crisis and briefly returns to his prehistoric ways.

Relation with other characters

Jerom lives at Lambik's home, where he acts as a sidekick to Lambik's antics. They are often each other's rivals, like in De Zwarte Zwaan ("The Black Swan"; 1958), where they both try to be the first to publish journalistic scoops. Sometimes they both fall in love with an attractive female and try to dispose of one another in becoming her partner. But when they both have a common social cause to fight for they are a firm, close-knit duo, for instance animal abuse, social apathy" and dictatorship.

In the 1976 Dutch puppet series about Suske en Wiske Jerom's part was voiced by Dutch actor Wim Wama. In the Suske en Wiske musical "De Stralende Sterren" (1994) Dirk Bosschaert played the part of Jerom. Jeroen Maes played Jerom in the musical "De Spokenjagers" (2002)   and by Ben Van Hoof in the musical "De Circusbaron" (2008). In the live-action film  (2004) he was played by Stany Crets. Flip Peeters voiced Jerom in the 3-D animated movie Luke and Lucy: The Texas Rangers (2009).

Jerom can also be seen as part of an illustrated wall dedicated to "Suske en Wiske" in the Laekenstraat in Brussels, Belgium. It was revealed on June 15, 1995.

In 2013 a statue of Jerom was placed in Middelkerke, in the vicinity of other statues of Belgian comics characters. It was designed by sculptor Monique Mol.

Sources

Belgian comics characters
Comics characters introduced in 1953
Belgian comics titles
Belgian comic strips
1962 comics debuts
Comics characters who can move at superhuman speeds
Comics characters with superhuman strength
Comic book sidekicks
Fictional characters with air or wind abilities
Fictional characters with ice or cold abilities
Fictional characters with electric or magnetic abilities
Fictional characters with fire or heat abilities
Fictional characters with gravity abilities
Fictional characters who can manipulate darkness or shadows
Fictional characters who can manipulate light
Fictional characters with metal abilities
Fictional characters with weather abilities
Fictional prehistoric characters
Prehistoric people in popular culture
Fictional characters from Flanders
Comics spin-offs
Humor comics
Fantasy comics
Superhero comics
Spike and Suzy
Comics by Willy Vandersteen
Comics set in Belgium
Male characters in comics